In 1841, Spencer Jarnagin was nominated for U.S. Senator by the Whig caucus in the Tennessee General Assembly. However, some of the Democrats in the legislature decided that no senator would be preferable to a Whig. Known as the "Immortal Thirteen" by Tennessee Democrats, they refused to allow a quorum on the issue. By the time Jarnagin was eventually elected to the seat and sworn in, over two and half years, almost half of the term, had elapsed. Jarnagin finally assumed office on October 17, 1843.

See also 
 1842 and 1843 United States Senate elections
1843
Tennessee
United States Senate
Tennessee 1843
Tennessee 1843
United States Senate 1843
Single-candidate elections